The Academy of Music and Drama (Swedish: Högskolan för scen och musik, abbreviated HSM) at the University of Gothenburg is a school for music, composition, opera singing, music staging, teaching of music and creative subjects in Gothenburg. It belongs to the Faculty of Fine, Applied and Performing Arts.

It was started in 2005. as a merger of the former departments of music, theater and opera at the university.

The main campus building is Artisten in Gothenburg.

The school also acts as a training center for orchestral music. The programme is called the Swedish National Orchestra Academy (SNOA) and was started by the then head Ingemar Henningsson after preparatory work with the Gothenburg Symphony Orchestra (Göteborgs Symfoniker). The two-year program organizes about 8 or 9 orchestral projects per academic year.

Notable people
Eva Nässén

References

University of Gothenburg
Music schools in Sweden
Drama schools in Sweden
Buildings and structures in Gothenburg
University departments in Sweden
2005 establishments in Sweden
Educational institutions established in 2005
Arts organizations established in 2005